Montreux '77 is a live album by pianist Ray Bryant recorded at the Montreux Jazz Festival in 1977 and released by the Pablo label.

Reception

AllMusic reviewer Scott Yanow awarded the album 4.5 stars and said that Bryant's "distinctive and soulful style fits well into every setting, making this an easily recommended set that will satisfy most musical tastes."

Track listing
All compositions by Ray Bryant except where noted
 "Take the 'A' Train" (Billy Strayhorn) – 4:48
 "Georgia On My Mind" (Hoagy Carmichael, Stuart Gorrell) – 4:54
 "Jungle Town Jubilee" – 3:19
 "If I Could Just Make It To Heaven" (traditional) – 4:09
 "Django" (John Lewis) – 4:16
 "Blues No. 6" – 7:40
 "Satin Doll" (Duke Ellington, Johnny Mercer, Billy Strayhorn) – 4:38
 "Sometimes I Feel Like a Motherless Child" (traditional) – 4:35
 "St. Louis Blues" (W. C. Handy) – 5:52
 "Things Ain't What They Used To Be" (Mercer Ellington, Ted Persons) – 4:37

Personnel 
Ray Bryant – piano

References 

1977 live albums
Ray Bryant live albums
Pablo Records live albums
Albums produced by Norman Granz
albums recorded at the Montreux Jazz Festival